Empedomorpha is a genus of crane fly in the family Limoniidae.

Distribution
North America.

Species
E. apacheana (Alexander, 1946)
E. empedoides (Alexander, 1916)

References

Limoniidae
Nematocera genera
Diptera of North America